is a 2011 Japanese romance and mystery film directed by Masaaki Taniguchi who directed Time Traveller: The Girl Who Leapt Through Time in 2010. His directed film Ranhansha was also released on the same day. This film was shot in Hakodate, Hokkaido. In both films, Mirei Kiritani plays the lead role.

Cast
 Mirei Kiritani as Mano
 Haru Aoyama

References

External links
  
 
 スノーフレーク(2011) at allcinema 
 スノーフレーク at KINENOTE 

2010s Japanese films
2010s mystery films
2010s romance films
2011 films
2010s Japanese-language films
Japanese mystery films
Japanese romance films